The 2019 Liga Dominicana de Fútbol (known as the LDF Banco Popular for sponsorship reasons) was the fifth season of professional football in the Dominican Republic. The season started on 30 March 2019.

Format
The 2019 tournament of the Liga Dominicana de Futbol will start with 12 teams. The event will be developed with a new format, each of the twelve clubs can have up to 6 foreign players on their payroll.

The new format includes an "Apertura" and a "Clausura" tournament, both will be played one round and has been agreed with the twelve clubs and also with CONCACAF. The "Apertura" will have a semifinal with the four best teams and then a final, as well as the "Clausura".

Then the champion of each tournament will compete to win the qualification to the CONCACAF championship tournament. Another club will qualify for the CONCACAF tournament, accumulating the most points in both tournaments.

Apertura

Regular season

Regular season results

Playoffs

Clausura

Regular season

Regular season results

Playoffs

Grand final
Played between champions of Apertura and Clausura.

Atlético Pantoja qualifies for 2020 Caribbean Club Championship.

Aggregate table

References

Football in the Dominican Republic
Dominican Republic
Dominican Republic
2019 in Dominican Republic sport
Liga Dominicana de Fútbol seasons